New Hope for the Dead is the second studio album by English rock band UK Decay. It was released 22 April 2013 by record label Rainbow City.

The album was funded via the website PledgeMusic and recorded in Dover with producer Chris Tsangarides.

The album features artwork by Italian painter Franko B.

Reception
The album received positive reviews from critics. In a review for Louder Than War, Dave Jennings stated that the band "have never sounded better". Ross Watson, writing for The Skinny, gave it a four-star review, stating that the band have "proven their relevance with a fruitful set of new recordings".

Track listing 

All songs: Farley Hill Music 2013.

 "Shake ‘em Up"
 "Heavy Metal Jews"
 "Next Generation????"
 "Killer"
 "This City Is a Cage"
 "Woman With a Black Heart"
 "Revolutionary Love Song"
 "Shout"
 "All the Faces in History"
 "I Feel Good"
 "Drink"

Personnel 

 Abbo – vocals, guitar
 Eddie B – bass guitar
 Raymondo – drums
 Spon – guitar, keyboards, fx
 Chairman "Che" – inspiration and cigars

 Technical

 Chris Tsangarides – producer
 Franko B – Cover paintings
 Esa – Guy Fawkes painting
 Suzanne Krasnowska – sleeve design and artwork
 Hugo Glendenning – photography
 Kevin Metclafe – mastering

References 

2013 albums
UK Decay albums